The House of Kastrioti was an Albanian noble family, active in the 14th and 15th centuries as the rulers of the Principality of Kastrioti. At the beginning of the 15th century, the family controlled a territory in the Mat and Dibra regions. The most notable member was Gjergj Kastrioti, better known as Skanderbeg, regarded today as an Albanian hero for leading the resistance against Mehmed the Conqueror's efforts to expand the Ottoman Empire into Albania. After Skanderbeg's death and the fall of the Principality in 1468, the Kastrioti family gave their allegiance to the Kingdom of Naples and were given control over the Duchy of San Pietro in Galatina and the County of Soleto, now in the Province of Lecce, Italy. Ferrante (died 1561), son of Gjon Kastrioti II, Duke of Galatina and Count of Soleto, is the direct ancestor of all male members of the Kastrioti family today. Today, the family consists of two Italian branches, one in Lecce and the other in Naples. The descendants of the House of Kastrioti in Italy use the family name "Castriota Scanderbeg".

History

A figure attested as Kastriot of Kanina in southern Albania who appears in a letter sent on September 2, 1368 by Alexander Komnenos Asen to the Ragusan senate has been hypothesised by a number of authors, mostly in the early 20th century, as an ancestor of the Kastrioti family. Heinrich Kretschmayr argued that this Kastriot may have been in fact Pal or Gjergj Kastrioti, John Fine considered it "probable" that this Kastriot was an ancestor of Gjon Kastrioti and Aleks Buda tried to bridge the geographical discrepancy between the Kastriot of Kanina who lived in southern Albania and the Kastrioti who were active in north-central Albania by arguing that after the fall of the Balšić, they returned to their ancestral lands in the Dibër valley. In contemporary historiography, the figure recorded as Kastriot of Kanina in 1368 is considered to be unrelated to the Kastrioti family. The Kastrioti so far remain absent from historical or archival records in comparison to other Albanian noble families until their first historical appearance at the end of the 14th century.
The historical figure of Konstantin Kastrioti Mazreku is attested in Giovanni Andrea Angelo Flavio Comneno's Genealogia diversarum principum familiarum. Angelo mentions Kastrioti as Constantinus Castriotus, cognomento Meserechus, Aemathiae & Castoriae Princeps (Constantinus Castriotus, surnamed Meserechus, Prince of Aemathia and Castoria). The toponym Castoria has been interpreted as Kastriot, Kastrat in Has, Kastrat in Dibra or the microtoponym "Kostur" near the village of Mazrek in the Has region. In connection to the Kastrioti family name, it is very likely that the name of one the different Kastriot or Kastrat which were fortified settlements as their etymology shows (castrum) was as their family name. The Kastrioti may have originated from this village or probably had acquired it as pronoia. Angelo used the cognomen Meserechus in reference to Skanderbeg and this link to the same name is produced in other sources and reproduced in later ones like Du Cange's Historia Byzantina (1680). These links highlight that the Kastrioti used Mazreku as a name that highlighted their tribal affiliation (farefisni). The name Mazrek(u), which means horse breeder in Albanian, is found throughout all Albanian regions. The Kastrioti themselves where organised in a tribal structure and formed a fis or clan/tribe.

Konstantin Kastrioti's son, who was the father of Gjon Kastrioti and grandfather of Skanderbeg, appears in two historical sources, Gjon Muzaka's Breve memoria de li discendenti de nostra casa Musachi (1510) and Andrea Angelo's Genealogia diversarum principum familiarum (1603/1610) who was later largely reproduced by Du Cange (1680). Angelo calls Gjon Kastrioti's father "Georgius Castriotus" (Gjergj), lord (princeps) of "Aemathiae, Umenestria" (Mat and probably Ujmisht) and "Castoriae". Muzaka calls him "Paulo Castrioto" (Pal) and asserts that "he ruled over no more than two villages, called Signa and Gardi Ipostesi" (Sinë and Gardhi i Poshtëm, in Çidhën of Dibër). His first name is disputed. Neither name can be characterized as the correct version because of an extreme lack of sources. The name "Paulo" (Pal) is mentioned only by one author (Muzaka) and wasn't used as the name of any of his grandsons (Reposh, Konstantin, Stanisha, Gjergj) or great-grandsons (Giorgio, Costantino, Ferrante).

His rule over "only two villages" as described by Muzaka has been disputed because if true, it would mean that his son, Gjon Kastrioti who ruled over a much larger area rose to power in the span of one generation. This is considered a very unlikely trajectory in the context of Albanian medieval society because noble families had acquired their area of influence over multiple generations. Historian Kristo Frashëri considers it likely that he ruled over his region "in the third quartier of the 14th century" between 1350-75 based on the fact that when his grandson Gjergj Kastrioti was born, his son Gjon had already fathered eight children.

His son, Gjon Kastrioti (died 1437), became the lord of Matia (Mat). He managed to expand his territory but was ultimately subdued by the invading Ottomans. The most notable member was Gjergj Kastrioti, better known as Skanderbeg (1405–1468), declared an Albanian national hero, renowned in Albanian folklore for uniting the Albanian principalities in a military and diplomatic alliance, the League of Lezhë, which fought against Mehmed the Conqueror's efforts to further expand the Ottoman Empire into Europe.

Titles
The list of titles used by Kastrioti family are:

Albania in the Middle Ages
 Lord or King of Albania
 Prince of Kruja (Principality of Kastrioti)
 Lord of Sina and Lower Gardi
 Lord of Emathia and Vumenestia
In Ottoman Empire 
 Sanjakbey of the Sanjak of Dibra
 Subaşi of Krujë
In the Kingdom of Naples
 Duke of San Pietro in Galatina
 Count of Soleto
 Signore of Monte Sant'Angelo
 Signore of San Giovanni Rotondo
 Baron of Gagliano 
 Baron of Salignano
 Baron of Arigliano

Members

 Kostandin Kastrioti, possibly the father of Pal Kastrioti
 Pal Kastrioti - had the title "segnior de Signa et de Gardi-ipostesi" (Sina and Lower Gardi),  three sons
 Aleks Kastrioti - lord of three villages, unknown issue
 Kostandin Kastrioti - Lord of Kruja castle, unknown issue
 Gjon Kastrioti (fl. 1407-1437†), married Voisava Tripalda, nine children
 Reposh Kastrioti - († 1430 or 1431), unknown issue, possibly father of Constantine
 Stanisha Kastrioti - († 1445?), one son
 Hamza Kastrioti - (After 1457)
 Kostandin Kastrioti, unknown issue, possibly father of Constantine
 Constantine Kastrioti
 Mara Kastrioti, married Stefan I Crnojević, buried in Kom Monastery, three sons (Ivan, Andrija and Božidar)
  Skanderbeg (Gjergj Kastrioti) - Albanian national hero (d. 1468)
 Gjon Kastrioti II (d. 1501)- Count of Soleto, married Jerina Branković, daughter of despot Lazar Branković of Serbia
 Costantino Castriota (d. 1500), bishop of Isernia (fl. 1498)
 Ferrante Castrioti (d. 1561), duke of San Pietro in Galatina, Venetian military (fl. 1499–1501)
 Maria (d. 1569)
 Giorgio (d. 1540)
 R. B. Castrioti (b. 1994) Descendant
 Jelena Kastrioti - married Pavle Balšić with whom she had George Strez Balšić, Lord of Misia
 Mamica Kastrioti, married Muzakë Thopia in 1445
 Angelina Kastrioti, married Vladan Arianiti
 Vlajka Kastrioti, married Gjin Muzaka, secondly Stefan Strez Balšić, two sons with Stefan with whom she had Gojko Balšić and Ivan Strez Balšić

Two possible members of the Kastrioti are recorded in the Ottoman defter of 1467. The first, a certain Dimitri Kastrijoti, appears as a household head from the village of Setina e Poshtme which, alongside Setina e Sipërme, can be identified with Signa which was traditionally held by the Kastrioti. The second was a yamak by the name of Mark Kastrioti from Derjan who was stationed in Shtjaknëz (modern Shqefën).

Italian period

After the fall of Albania to the Ottoman Empire, the Kingdom of Naples gave land and noble title to Skanderbeg's family, the Kastrioti. His family were given control over the Duchy of San Pietro in Galatina and the County of Soleto, now in the Province of Lecce in Italy. His son, Gjon Kastrioti II,  married Jerina Branković, daughter of Serbian Despot Lazar Branković and one of the last descendants of the Palaiologos. Two patrilineal branches of the Kastrioti family exist today: the branch of Lecce with two sub-branches and the branch of Napoli with one sub-branch. Both branches are patrilineally descended from the sons of Ferrante (-1561), Duke of Galatina and Count of Spoleto.

Armorials

Main branch

Cadet branches

Footnotes

References

Sources

External links
 I Castriota Scanderbeg 
 Genealogical Tree

 
League of Lezhë